Old English, or Anglo-Saxon, is the earliest recorded form of the English language, spoken in England and southern and eastern Scotland in the early Middle Ages. It developed from the languages brought to Great Britain by Anglo-Saxon settlers in the mid-5th century, and the first Old English literary works date from the mid-7th century. After the Norman conquest of 1066, English was replaced, for a time, by Anglo-Norman (a relative of French) as the language of the upper classes. This is regarded as marking the end of the Old English era, since during this period the English language was heavily influenced by Anglo-Norman, developing into a phase known now as Middle English in England and Early Scots in Scotland.

Old English developed from a set of Anglo-Frisian or Ingvaeonic dialects originally spoken by Germanic tribes traditionally known as the Angles, Saxons and Jutes. As the Germanic settlers became dominant in England, their language replaced the languages of Roman Britain: Common Brittonic, a Celtic language; and Latin, brought to Britain by the Roman invasion. Old English had four main dialects, associated with particular Anglo-Saxon kingdoms: Mercian, Northumbrian, Kentish and West Saxon. It was West Saxon that formed the basis for the literary standard of the later Old English period, although the dominant forms of Middle and Modern English would develop mainly from Mercian, and Scots from Northumbrian. The speech of eastern and northern parts of England was subject to strong Old Norse influence due to Scandinavian rule and settlement beginning in the 9th century.

Old English is one of the West Germanic languages, and its closest relatives are Old Frisian and Old Saxon. Like other old Germanic languages, it is very different from Modern English and Modern Scots, and largely incomprehensible for Modern English or Modern Scots speakers without study.  Within Old English grammar nouns, adjectives, pronouns and verbs have many inflectional endings and forms, and word order is much freer. The oldest Old English inscriptions were written using a runic system, but from about the 8th century this was replaced by a version of the Latin alphabet.

Etymology
Englisċ, from which the word English is derived, means 'pertaining to the Angles'. In Old English, this word was derived from Angles (one of the Germanic tribes who conquered parts of Great Britain in the 5th century). During the 9th century, all invading Germanic tribes were referred to as Englisċ. It has been hypothesised that the Angles acquired their name because their land on the coast of Jutland (now mainland Denmark and Schleswig-Holstein) resembled a fishhook. Proto-Germanic  also had the meaning of 'narrow', referring to the shallow waters near the coast. That word ultimately goes back to Proto-Indo-European , also meaning 'narrow'.

Another theory is that the derivation of 'narrow' is the more likely connection to angling (as in fishing), which itself stems from a Proto-Indo-European (PIE) root meaning bend, angle. The semantic link is the fishing hook, which is curved or bent at an angle. In any case, the Angles may have been called such because they were a fishing people or were originally descended from such, and therefore England would mean 'land of the fishermen', and English would be 'the fishermen's language'.

History

Old English was not static, and its usage covered a period of 700 years, from the Anglo-Saxon settlement of Britain in the 5th century to the late 11th century, some time after the Norman invasion. While indicating that the establishment of dates is an arbitrary process, Albert Baugh dates Old English from 450 to 1150, a period of full inflections, a synthetic language. Perhaps around 85% of Old English words are no longer in use, but those that survived are the basic elements of Modern English vocabulary.

Old English is a West Germanic language, and developed out of Ingvaeonic (also known as North Sea Germanic) dialects from the 5th century. It came to be spoken over most of the territory of the Anglo-Saxon kingdoms which became the Kingdom of England. This included most of present-day England, as well as part of what is now southeastern Scotland, which for several centuries belonged to the kingdom of Northumbria. Other parts of the island continued to use Celtic languages (Gaelic – and perhaps some Pictish – in most of Scotland, Medieval Cornish all over Cornwall and in adjacent parts of Devon, Cumbric perhaps to the 12th century in parts of Cumbria, and Welsh in Wales and possibly also on the English side of the Anglo-Welsh border); except in the areas of Scandinavian settlements, where Old Norse was spoken and Danish law applied.

Old English literacy developed after Christianisation in the late 7th century. The oldest surviving work of Old English literature is Cædmon's Hymn, which was composed between 658 and 680 but not written down until the early 8th century. There is a limited corpus of runic inscriptions from the 5th to 7th centuries, but the oldest coherent runic texts (notably the inscriptions on the Franks Casket) date to the early 8th century. The Old English Latin alphabet was introduced around the 8th century.

With the unification of several of the Anglo-Saxon kingdoms (outside the Danelaw) by Alfred the Great in the later 9th century, the language of government and literature became standardised around the West Saxon dialect (Early West Saxon). Alfred advocated education in English alongside Latin, and had many works translated into the English language; some of them, such as Pope Gregory I's treatise Pastoral Care, appear to have been translated by Alfred himself. In Old English, typical of the development of literature, poetry arose before prose, but Alfred chiefly inspired the growth of prose.

A later literary standard, dating from the late 10th century, arose under the influence of Bishop Æthelwold of Winchester, and was followed by such writers as the prolific Ælfric of Eynsham ("the Grammarian"). This form of the language is known as the "Winchester standard", or more commonly as Late West Saxon. It is considered to represent the "classical" form of Old English. It retained its position of prestige until the time of the Norman Conquest, after which English ceased for a time to be of importance as a literary language.

The history of Old English can be subdivided into:
Prehistoric Old English (c. 450 to 650); for this period, Old English is mostly a reconstructed language as no literary witnesses survive (with the exception of limited epigraphic evidence). This language, or closely related group of dialects, spoken by the Angles, Saxons, and Jutes, and pre-dating documented Old English or Anglo-Saxon, has also been called Primitive Old English. 
Early Old English (c. 650 to 900), the period of the oldest manuscript traditions, with authors such as Cædmon, Bede, Cynewulf and Aldhelm.
Late Old English (c. 900 to 1170), the final stage of the language leading up to the Norman conquest of England and the subsequent transition to Early Middle English.

The Old English period is followed by Middle English (12th to 15th century), Early Modern English (c. 1480 to 1650) and finally Modern English (after 1650), and in Scotland Early Scots (before 1450), Middle Scots (c. 1450 to 1700) and Modern Scots (after 1700).

Dialects

Just as Modern English is not monolithic, Old English varied according to place. Despite the diversity of language of the Germanic-speaking migrants who established Old English in England and southeastern Scotland, it is possible to reconstruct proto-Old English as a fairly unitary language. For the most part, the differences between the attested regional dialects of Old English developed within England and southeastern Scotland, rather than on the Mainland of Europe. Although from the tenth century Old English writing from all regions tended to conform to a written standard based on Late West Saxon, in speech Old English continued to exhibit much local and regional variation, which remained in Middle English and to some extent Modern English dialects.

The four main dialectal forms of Old English were Mercian, Northumbrian, Kentish, and West Saxon. Mercian and Northumbrian are together referred to as Anglian. In terms of geography the Northumbrian region lay north of the Humber River; the Mercian lay north of the Thames and south of the Humber River; West Saxon lay south and southwest of the Thames; and the smallest, Kentish region lay southeast of the Thames, a small corner of England. The Kentish region, settled by the Jutes from Jutland, has the scantest literary remains. The term West Saxon actually is represented by two different dialects: Early West Saxon and Late West Saxon. Hogg has suggested that these two dialects would be more appropriately named Alfredian Saxon and Æthelwoldian Saxon, respectively, so that the naive reader would not assume that they are chronologically related.

Each of these four dialects was associated with an independent kingdom on the islands. Of these, Northumbria south of the Tyne, and most of Mercia, were overrun by the Vikings during the 9th century. The portion of Mercia that was successfully defended, and all of Kent, were then integrated into Wessex under Alfred the Great.
From that time on, the West Saxon dialect (then in the form now known as Early West Saxon) became standardised as the language of government, and as the basis for the many works of literature and religious materials produced or translated from Latin in that period.

The later literary standard known as Late West Saxon (see History, above), although centred in the same region of the country, appears not to have been directly descended from Alfred's Early West Saxon.

Due to the centralisation of power and the destruction wrought by Viking invasions, there is relatively little written record of the non-West Saxon dialects after Alfred's unification. Some Mercian texts continued to be written, however, and the influence of Mercian is apparent in some of the translations produced under Alfred's programme, many of which were produced by Mercian scholars. Other dialects certainly continued to be spoken, as is evidenced by the continued variation between their successors in Middle and Modern English. In fact, what would become the standard forms of Middle English and of Modern English are descended from Mercian rather than West Saxon, while Scots developed from the Northumbrian dialect. It was once claimed that, owing to its position at the heart of the Kingdom of Wessex, the relics of Anglo-Saxon accent, idiom and vocabulary were best preserved in the dialect of Somerset.

For details of the sound differences between the dialects, see .

Influence of other languages

The language of the Anglo-Saxon settlers appears not to have been significantly affected by the native British Celtic languages which it largely displaced. The number of Celtic loanwords introduced into the language is very small, although dialect and toponymic terms are more often retained in western language contact zones (Cumbria, Devon, Welsh Marches and Borders and so on) than in the east. However, various suggestions have been made concerning possible influence that Celtic may have had on developments in English syntax in the post–Old English period, such as the regular progressive construction and analytic word order, as well as the eventual development of the periphrastic auxiliary verb do. These ideas have generally not received widespread support from linguists, particularly as many of the theorized Brittonicisms do not become widespread until the late Middle English and Early Modern English periods, in addition to the fact that similar forms exist in other modern Germanic languages.

Old English contained a certain number of loanwords from Latin, which was the scholarly and diplomatic lingua franca of Western Europe. It is sometimes possible to give approximate dates for the borrowing of individual Latin words based on which patterns of sound change they have undergone. Some Latin words had already been borrowed into the Germanic languages before the ancestral Angles and Saxons left continental Europe for Britain. More entered the language when the Anglo-Saxons were converted to Christianity and Latin-speaking priests became influential. It was also through Irish Christian missionaries that the Latin alphabet was introduced and adapted for the writing of Old English, replacing the earlier runic system. Nonetheless, the largest transfer of Latin-based (mainly Old French) words into English occurred after the Norman Conquest of 1066, and thus in the Middle English rather than the Old English period.

Another source of loanwords was Old Norse, which came into contact with Old English via the Scandinavian rulers and settlers in the Danelaw from the late 9thcentury, and during the rule of Cnut and other Danish kings in the early 11thcentury. Many place names in eastern and northern England are of Scandinavian origin. Norse borrowings are relatively rare in Old English literature, being mostly terms relating to government and administration. The literary standard, however, was based on the West Saxon dialect, away from the main area of Scandinavian influence; the impact of Norse may have been greater in the eastern and northern dialects. Certainly in Middle English texts, which are more often based on eastern dialects, a strong Norse influence becomes apparent. Modern English contains many, often everyday, words that were borrowed from Old Norse, and the grammatical simplification that occurred after the Old English period is also often attributed to Norse influence.

The influence of Old Norse certainly helped move English from a synthetic language along the continuum to a more analytic word order, and Old Norse most likely made a greater impact on the English language than any other language. The eagerness of Vikings in the Danelaw to communicate with their Anglo-Saxon neighbours produced a friction that led to the erosion of the complicated inflectional word endings. Simeon Potter notes: 

The strength of the Viking influence on Old English appears from the fact that the indispensable elements of the language – pronouns, modals, comparatives, pronominal adverbs (like hence and together), conjunctions and prepositions – show the most marked Danish influence; the best evidence of Scandinavian influence appears in the extensive word borrowings because, as Jespersen indicates, no texts exist in either Scandinavia or Northern England from this time to give certain evidence of an influence on syntax. The effect of Old Norse on Old English was substantive, pervasive, and of a democratic character. Old Norse and Old English resembled each other closely like cousins, and with some words in common, speakers roughly understood each other; in time the inflections melted away and the analytic pattern emerged. It is most  This blending of peoples and languages resulted in "simplifying English grammar".

Phonology

The inventory of Early West Saxon surface phones is as follows.

The sounds enclosed in parentheses in the chart above are not considered to be phonemes:
 is an allophone of  occurring after  and when geminated (doubled).
 is an allophone of  occurring before [k] and [ɡ].
 are voiced allophones of  respectively, occurring between vowels or voiced consonants when the preceding sound was stressed.
 are allophones of  occurring at the beginning of a word or after a front vowel, respectively.
 is an allophone of  occurring after  or when doubled. At some point before the Middle English period,  also became the pronunciation word-initially.
the voiceless sonorants  occur after [h] in the sequences .

The open back rounded vowel  was an allophone of short /ɑ/ which occurred in stressed syllables before nasal consonants (/m/ and /n/). It was variously spelled either ⟨a⟩ or ⟨o⟩.

In West Saxon and Kentish, it had already merged with  before the first written prose.

Other dialects had different systems of diphthongs.

For more on dialectal differences, see Phonological history of Old English (dialects).

Sound changes

Some of the principal sound changes occurring in the pre-history and history of Old English were the following:
Monophthongisation of the diphthong , and modification of remaining diphthongs to the height-harmonic type.
Diphthongisation of long and short front vowels in certain positions ("breaking").
The process known as i-mutation (which for example led to modern mice as the plural of mouse).
Loss of certain weak vowels in word-final and medial positions; reduction of remaining unstressed vowels. 
Diphthongisation of certain vowels before certain consonants when preceding a back vowel ("back mutation").
Collapse of two consecutive vowels into a single vowel.
"Palatal umlaut", which has given forms such as six (compare German sechs).

For more details of these processes, see the main article, linked above. For sound changes before and after the Old English period, see Phonological history of English.

Grammar

Morphology
Nouns decline for five cases: nominative, accusative, genitive, dative, instrumental; three genders: masculine, feminine, neuter; and two numbers: singular, and plural; and are strong or weak. The instrumental is vestigial and only used with the masculine and neuter singular and often replaced by the dative. Only pronouns and strong adjectives retain separate instrumental forms. There is also sparse early Northumbrian evidence of a sixth case: the locative. The evidence comes from Northumbrian Runic texts  (e.g.,  on rodi "on the Cross").

Adjectives agree with nouns in case, gender, and number, and can be either strong or weak. Pronouns and sometimes participles agree in case, gender, and number. First-person and second-person personal pronouns occasionally distinguish dual-number forms. The definite article  and its inflections serve as a definite article ("the"), a demonstrative adjective ("that"), and demonstrative pronoun. These words inflect for case, gender, and number. Adjectives have both strong and weak sets of endings, weak ones being used when a definite or possessive determiner is also present.

Verbs conjugate for three persons: first, second, and third; two numbers: singular, plural; two tenses: present, and past; three moods: indicative, subjunctive, and imperative; and are strong (exhibiting ablaut) or weak (exhibiting a dental suffix). Verbs have two infinitive forms: bare and bound; and two participles: present and past. The subjunctive has past and present forms. Finite verbs agree with subjects in person and number. The future tense, passive voice, and other aspects are formed with compounds.
Adpositions are mostly before but are often after their object. If the object of an adposition is marked in the dative case, an adposition may conceivably be located anywhere in the sentence.

Remnants of the Old English case system in Modern English are in the forms of a few pronouns (such as I/me/mine, she/her, who/whom/whose) and in the possessive ending -'s, which derives from the masculine and neuter genitive ending -es. The modern English plural ending -(e)s derives from the Old English -as, but the latter applied only to "strong" masculine nouns in the nominative and accusative cases; different plural endings were used in other instances. Old English nouns had grammatical gender, while modern English has only natural gender.

In Old English's verbal compound constructions are the beginnings of the compound tenses of Modern English. As in Modern English, and peculiar to the Germanic languages, the verbs formed two great classes: weak (regular), and strong (irregular). Like today, Old English had fewer strong verbs, and many of these have over time decayed into weak forms. Then, as now, dental suffixes indicated the past tense of the weak verbs, as in work and worked.

Syntax
Old English syntax is similar to that of modern English. Some differences are consequences of the greater level of nominal and verbal inflection, allowing freer word order.
Default word order is verb-second in main clauses, and verb-final in subordinate clauses
No do-support in questions and negatives. Questions were usually formed by inverting subject and finite verb, and negatives by placing ne before the finite verb, regardless of which verb. 
Multiple negatives can stack up in a sentence intensifying each other (negative concord).
Sentences with subordinate clauses of the type "when X, Y" (e.g. The wh-words are used only as interrogatives and as indefinite pronouns.
Similarly, wh- forms were not used as relative pronouns. Instead, the indeclinable word  is used, often preceded by (or replaced by) the appropriate form of the article/demonstrative .

Orthography

Old English was first written in runes, using the futhorc—a rune set derived from the Germanic 24-character elder futhark, extended by five more runes used to represent Anglo-Saxon vowel sounds and sometimes by several more additional characters. From around the 8th century, the runic system came to be supplanted by a (minuscule) half-uncial script of the Latin alphabet introduced by Irish Christian missionaries. This was replaced by Insular script, a cursive and pointed version of the half-uncial script. This was used until the end of the 12th century when continental Carolingian minuscule (also known as Caroline) replaced the insular.

A few letter pairs were used as digraphs, representing a single sound. Also used was the Tironian note  (a character similar to the digit 7) for the conjunction and. A common scribal abbreviation was a thorn with a stroke , which was used for the pronoun . Macrons over vowels were originally used not to mark long vowels (as in modern editions), but to indicate stress, or as abbreviations for a following m or n.

Modern editions of Old English manuscripts generally introduce some additional conventions. Macrons are used to indicate long vowels, where usually no distinction was made between long and short vowels in the originals. (In some older editions an acute accent mark was used for consistency with Old Norse conventions.)

In contrast with Modern English orthography, that of Old English was reasonably regular, with a mostly predictable correspondence between letters and phonemes. The following table lists the Old English letters and digraphs together with the phonemes they represent, using the same notation as in the Phonology section above.

Literature

The corpus of Old English literature is small but still significant, with some 400 surviving manuscripts.  The pagan and Christian streams mingle in Old English, one of the richest and most significant bodies of literature preserved among the early Germanic peoples. In his supplementary article to the 1935 posthumous edition of Bright's Anglo-Saxon Reader, Dr. James Hulbert writes:

Some of the most important surviving works of Old English literature are Beowulf, an epic poem; the Anglo-Saxon Chronicle, a record of early English history; the Franks Casket, an inscribed early whalebone artefact; and Cædmon's Hymn, a Christian religious poem. There are also a number of extant prose works, such as sermons and saints' lives, biblical translations, and translated Latin works of the early Church Fathers, legal documents, such as laws and wills, and practical works on grammar, medicine, and geography. Still, poetry is considered the heart of Old English literature. Nearly all Anglo-Saxon authors are anonymous, with a few exceptions, such as Bede and Cædmon. Cædmon, the earliest English poet known by name, served as a lay brother in the monastery at Whitby.

Beowulf
The first example is taken from the opening lines of the folk-epic Beowulf, a poem of some 3,000 lines. This passage describes how Hrothgar's legendary ancestor Scyld was found as a baby, washed ashore, and adopted by a noble family. The translation is literal and represents the original poetic word order. As such, it is not typical of Old English prose. The modern cognates of original words have been used whenever practical to give a close approximation of the feel of the original poem.

The words in brackets are implied in the Old English by noun case and the bold words in brackets are explanations of words that have slightly different meanings in a modern context. Notice how what is used by the poet where a word like lo or behold would be expected. This usage is similar to what-ho!, both an expression of surprise and a call to attention.

English poetry is based on stress and alliteration. In the text below, the letters that alliterate are bolded.

Here is a natural enough Modern English translation, although the phrasing of the Old English passage has often been stylistically preserved, even though it is not usual in Modern English:

The Lord's Prayer

This text of the Lord's Prayer is presented in the standardised Early West Saxon dialect.

Charter of Cnut
This is a proclamation from King Cnut the Great to his earl Thorkell the Tall and the English people written in AD 1020. Unlike the previous two examples, this text is prose rather than poetry. For ease of reading, the passage has been divided into sentences while the pilcrows represent the original division.

The following is a natural Modern English translation, with the overall structure of the Old English passage preserved. Note that even though "earl" is used to translate its Old English cognate "eorl", "eorl" in Old English does not correspond exactly to "earl" of the later medieval period:

Dictionaries

Early history
The earliest history of Old English lexicography lies in the Anglo-Saxon period itself, when English-speaking scholars created English glosses on Latin texts. At first these were often marginal or interlinear glosses, but soon came to be gathered into word-lists such as the Épinal-Erfurt, Leiden and Corpus Glossaries. Over time, these word-lists were consolidated and alphabeticised to create extensive Latin-Old English glossaries with some of the character of dictionaries, such as the Cleopatra Glossaries, the Harley Glossary and the Brussels Glossary. In some cases, the material in these glossaries continued to be circulated and updated in Middle English glossaries, such as the Durham Plant-Name Glossary and the Laud Herbal Glossary.

Old English lexicography was revived in the early modern period, drawing heavily on Anglo-Saxons' own glossaries. The major publication at this time was William Somner's Dictionarium Saxonico-Latino-Anglicum. The next substantial Old English dictionary was Joseph Bosworth's Anglo-Saxon Dictionary of 1838.

Modern
In modern scholarship, the following dictionaries remain current:

 Cameron, Angus, et al. (ed.) (1983-). Dictionary of Old English. Toronto: Published for the Dictionary of Old English Project, Centre for Medieval Studies, University of Toronto by the Pontifical Institute of Medieval Studies. Initially issued on microfiche and subsequently as a CD-ROM, the dictionary is now primarily published online at https://www.doe.utoronto.ca. This generally supersedes previous dictionaries where available. As of September 2018, the dictionary covered A-I.
 Bosworth, Joseph and T. Northcote Toller. (1898). An Anglo-Saxon Dictionary. Oxford: Clarendon Press. The main research dictionary for Old English, unless superseded by the Dictionary of Old English. Various digitisations are available open-access, including at http://bosworth.ff.cuni.cz/. Due to errors and omissions in the 1898 publication, this needs to be read in conjunction with:
 T. Northcote Toller. (1921). An Anglo-Saxon Dictionary: Supplement. Oxford: Clarendon Press.
 Alistair Campbell (1972). An Anglo-Saxon Dictionary: Enlarged addenda and corrigenda. Oxford: Clarendon Press.
 Clark Hall, J. R. (1969). A Concise Anglo-Saxon Dictionary. 4th rev. edn by Herbet D. Meritt. Cambridge: Cambridge University Press. Occasionally more accurate than Bosworth-Toller, and widely used as a reading dictionary. Various digitisations are available, including here.
 Roberts, Jane and Christian Kay, with Lynne Grundy, A Thesaurus of Old English in Two Volumes, Costerus New Series, 131–32, 2nd rev. impression, 2 vols (Amsterdam: Rodopi, 2000), also available online. A thesaurus based on the definitions in Bosworth-Toller and the structure of Roget's Thesaurus.

Though focused on later periods, the Oxford English Dictionary, Middle English Dictionary, Dictionary of the Older Scottish Tongue, and Historical Thesaurus of English all also include material relevant to Old English.

Modern legacy
Like other historical languages, Old English has been used by scholars and enthusiasts of later periods to create texts either imitating Old English literature or deliberately transferring it to a different cultural context. Examples include Alistair Campbell and J. R. R. Tolkien. Ransom Riggs uses several Old English words, such as syndrigast (singular, peculiar), ymbryne (period, cycle), etc., dubbed as "Old Peculiar" ones.

A number of websites devoted to Modern Paganism and historical reenactment offer reference material and forums promoting the active use of Old English. There is also an Old English version of Wikipedia. However, one investigation found that many Neo-Old English texts published online bear little resemblance to the historical language and have many basic grammatical mistakes.

See also

 Anglish
 Exeter Book
 Go (verb)
 History of the Scots language
 I-mutation
 Ingvaeonic nasal spirant law
 List of generic forms in place names in the United Kingdom and Ireland
 List of Germanic and Latinate equivalents in English

References

Bibliography

Sources

General
 
 Baugh, Albert C; & Cable, Thomas. (1993). A History of the English Language (4th ed.). London: Routledge.
 Blake, Norman (1992). The Cambridge History of the English Language: Vol. 2. Cambridge: Cambridge University Press.
 Campbell, A. (1959). Old English Grammar. Oxford: Clarendon Press.
  (Reissue of one of 4 eds. 1877–1902)
 Euler, Wolfram (2013). Das Westgermanische : von der Herausbildung im 3. bis zur Aufgliederung im 7. Jahrhundert; Analyse und Rekonstruktion (West Germanic: from its Emergence in the 3rd up until its Dissolution in the 7th century CE: Analyses and Reconstruction). 244 p., in German with English summary, London/Berlin 2013, .
 
 Hogg, Richard M. (ed.). (1992). The Cambridge History of the English Language: (Vol 1): the Beginnings to 1066. Cambridge: Cambridge University Press.
 Hogg, Richard; & Denison, David (eds.) (2006) A History of the English Language. Cambridge: Cambridge University Press.
 Jespersen, Otto (1909–1949) A Modern English Grammar on Historical Principles. 7 vols. Heidelberg: C. Winter & Copenhagen: Ejnar Munksgaard
 Lass, Roger (1987) The Shape of English: structure and history. London: J. M. Dent & Sons
 
 
 
 
 Quirk, Randolph; & Wrenn, CL (1957). An Old English Grammar (2nd ed.) London: Methuen.
 Ringe, Donald R and Taylor, Ann (2014). The Development of Old English: A Linguistic History of English, vol. II, . Oxford.
 Strang, Barbara M. H. (1970) A History of English. London: Methuen.

External history
 
 Bremmer Jr, Rolf H. (2009). An Introduction to Old Frisian. History, Grammar, Reader, Glossary. Amsterdam and Philadelphia: John Benjamins.
 Stenton, FM (1971). Anglo-Saxon England (3rd ed.). Oxford: Clarendon Press.

Orthography/Palaeography
 Bourcier, Georges. (1978). L'orthographie de l'anglais: Histoire et situation actuelle. Paris: Presses Universitaires de France.
 Elliott, Ralph WV (1959). Runes: An introduction. Manchester: Manchester University Press.
 Keller, Wolfgang. (1906). Angelsächsische Paleographie, I: Einleitung. Berlin: Mayer & Müller.
 Ker, NR (1957). A Catalogue of Manuscripts Containing Anglo-Saxon. Oxford: Clarendon Press.
 Ker, NR (1957: 1990). A Catalogue of Manuscripts Containing Anglo-Saxon; with supplement prepared by Neil Ker originally published in Anglo-Saxon England; 5, 1957. Oxford: Clarendon Press 
 Page, RI (1973). An Introduction to English Runes. London: Methuen.
 Scragg, Donald G (1974). A History of English Spelling. Manchester: Manchester University Press.
 Shaw, Philip A (2012). "Coins As Evidence". The Oxford Handbook of the History of English, Chapter 3, pp. 50–52. Edited by Terttu Nevalainen and Elizabeth Closs Traugott.
 Wełna, Jerzy (1986). "The Old English Digraph  Again". Linguistics across Historical and Geographical Boundaries: Vol 1: Linguistic Theory and Historical Linguistics (pp. 753–762). Edited by Dieter Kastovsky and Aleksander Szwedek.

Phonology
 Anderson, John M; & Jones, Charles. (1977). Phonological structure and the history of English. North-Holland linguistics series (No. 33). Amsterdam: North-Holland.
 Brunner, Karl. (1965). Altenglische Grammatik (nach der angelsächsischen Grammatik von Eduard Sievers neubearbeitet) (3rd ed.). Tübingen: Max Niemeyer.
 Campbell, A. (1959). Old English Grammar. Oxford: Clarendon Press.
 Cercignani, Fausto (1983). "The Development of */k/ and */sk/ in Old English". Journal of English and Germanic Philology, 82 (3): 313–323.
 Girvan, Ritchie. (1931). Angelsaksisch Handboek; E. L. Deuschle (transl.). (Oudgermaansche Handboeken; No. 4). Haarlem: Tjeenk Willink.
 Halle, Morris; & Keyser, Samuel J. (1971). English Stress: its form, its growth, and its role in verse. New York: Harper & Row.
 
 
 
 Kuhn, Sherman M. (1970). "On the consonantal phonemes of Old English". In: J. L. Rosier (ed.) Philological Essays: studies in Old and Middle English language and literature in honour of Herbert Dean Merritt (pp. 16–49). The Hague: Mouton.
 Lass, Roger; & Anderson, John M. (1975). Old English Phonology. (Cambridge studies in linguistics; No. 14). Cambridge: Cambridge University Press.
 Luick, Karl. (1914–1940). Historische Grammatik der englischen Sprache. Stuttgart: Bernhard Tauchnitz.
 
 
 Minkova, Donka (2014). A Historical Phonology of English. Edinburgh University Press.
 Moulton, WG (1972). "The Proto-Germanic non-syllabics (consonants)". In: F van Coetsem & HL Kufner (Eds.), Toward a Grammar of Proto-Germanic (pp. 141–173). Tübingen: Max Niemeyer.
 Sievers, Eduard (1893). Altgermanische Metrik. Halle: Max Niemeyer.
 Wagner, Karl Heinz (1969). Generative Grammatical Studies in the Old English language. Heidelberg: Julius Groos.

Morphology
 Brunner, Karl. (1965). Altenglische Grammatik (nach der angelsächsischen Grammatik von Eduard Sievers neubearbeitet) (3rd ed.). Tübingen: Max Niemeyer.
 Campbell, A. (1959). Old English grammar. Oxford: Clarendon Press.
 Wagner, Karl Heinz. (1969). Generative grammatical studies in the Old English language. Heidelberg: Julius Groos.

Syntax
 Brunner, Karl. (1962). Die englische Sprache: ihre geschichtliche Entwicklung (Vol. II). Tübingen: Max Niemeyer.
 Kemenade, Ans van. (1982). Syntactic Case and Morphological Case in the History of English. Dordrecht: Foris.
 MacLaughlin, John C. (1983). Old English Syntax: a handbook. Tübingen: Max Niemeyer.
 Mitchell, Bruce. (1985). Old English Syntax (Vols. 1–2). Oxford: Clarendon Press (no more published)
 Vol.1: Concord, the parts of speech and the sentence
 Vol.2: Subordination, independent elements, and element order
 Mitchell, Bruce. (1990) A Critical Bibliography of Old English Syntax to the end of 1984, including addenda and corrigenda to "Old English Syntax" . Oxford: Blackwell
 Timofeeva, Olga. (2010) Non-finite Constructions in Old English, with Special Reference to Syntactic Borrowing from Latin, PhD dissertation, Mémoires de la Société Néophilologique de Helsinki, vol. LXXX, Helsinki: Société Néophilologique.
 Traugott, Elizabeth Closs. (1972). A History of English Syntax: a transformational approach to the history of English sentence structure. New York: Holt, Rinehart & Winston.
 Visser, F. Th. (1963–1973). An Historical Syntax of the English Language (Vols. 1–3). Leiden: E. J. Brill.

Lexicons
 Bosworth, J; & Toller, T. Northcote. (1898). An Anglo-Saxon Dictionary. Oxford: Clarendon Press. (Based on Bosworth's 1838 dictionary, his papers & additions by Toller)
 Toller, T. Northcote. (1921). An Anglo-Saxon Dictionary: Supplement. Oxford: Clarendon Press.
 Campbell, A. (1972). An Anglo-Saxon Dictionary: Enlarged addenda and corrigenda. Oxford: Clarendon Press.
 Clark Hall, J. R.; & Merritt, H. D. (1969). A Concise Anglo-Saxon Dictionary (4th ed.). Cambridge: Cambridge University Press.
 Cameron, Angus, et al. (ed.) (1983) Dictionary of Old English. Toronto: Published for the Dictionary of Old English Project, Centre for Medieval Studies, University of Toronto by the Pontifical Institute of Medieval Studies, 1983/1994. (Issued on microfiche and subsequently as a CD-ROM and on the World Wide Web.)

External links

Old English/Modern English Translator
Old English (Anglo-Saxon) alphabet
Old English Letters

Another downloadable keyboard for Windows computers
Guide to using Old English computer characters  (Unicode, HTML entities, etc.)
The Germanic Lexicon Project

The Lord's Prayer in Old English from the 11th century (video link)
Over 100 Old English poems are edited, annotated and linked to digital images of their manuscript pages, with modern translations, in the Old English Poetry in Facsimile Project: DM

Dictionaries
Bosworth and Toller, An Anglo-Saxon Dictionary Online

Dictionary of Old English

Lessons
Old English Online by Jonathan Slocum and Winfred P. Lehmann, free online lessons at the Linguistics Research Center at the University of Texas at Austin

Anglic languages
English, Old
 Old English
Languages attested from the 5th century
5th-century establishments in England
Languages extinct in the 13th century
13th-century disestablishments in Europe
North Sea Germanic